Sepp Helfrich (7 July 1900 – 27 January 1963) was an Austrian National Socialist and briefly the Landeshauptman (Governor) of Styria.

Biography

After a spending time at the elementary schools in Weißkirchen (present-day Bela Crkva, Banat, Vojvodina, Serbia), Krems an der Donau and Göllersdorf, the grammar school in Stockerau and the secondary school in Graz.

He completed his military service in 1918 in Italy. He studied at agronomy and construction at the Graz University of Technology until 1921 and subsequently studied at the Hochschule für Bodenkultur in Vienna.

He finished his studies in 1926 with an Engineering degree.  He was a member of the Verein Deutscher Studenten (German Student's Club) in Graz while he was in college. In 1928 he then working in the Agricultural Technology Service of the Landeshauptmannschaft Graz.

In March 1937 he was arrested for National Socialist activities. He was immediately pardoned after the Anschluss and was appointed as governor of Steiermark on 12 March 1938. However, he was only in this office for a short time, until 22 May 1938. He then served in the National Socialist Reichstag. He was arrested for his National Socialist past in 1945, but did not receive any severe sanction or punishment. He was active in the Styrian state government in Graz as an Agricultural planner from 1949-63.

References

Members of the Reichstag of Nazi Germany
Nazi Party members
1900 births
1963 deaths
Austrian Nazis
People from Lugoj
Governors of Styria